Home to Oblivion: An Elliott Smith Tribute is a 2006 instrumental tribute album to Elliott Smith by pianist Christopher O'Riley. The album received mixed reviews from critics.

Track listing

References 

2006 albums
Elliott Smith tribute albums